30th National Board of Review Awards
Late December, 1958
The 30th National Board of Review Awards were announced in late December, 1958.

Top Ten Films 
The Old Man and the Sea
Separate Tables
 The Last Hurrah
The Long, Hot Summer
Windjammer
Cat on a Hot Tin Roof
The Goddess
The Brothers Karamazov
Me and the Colonel
Gigi

Top Foreign Films 
Pather Panchali
Rouge et noir
The Horse's Mouth
Mon Oncle
A Night to Remember

Winners 
Best Film: The Old Man and the Sea
Best Foreign Film: Pather Panchali
Best Actor: Spencer Tracy (The Old Man and the Sea, The Last Hurrah)
Best Actress: Ingrid Bergman (The Inn of the Sixth Happiness)
Best Supporting Actor: Albert Salmi (The Brothers Karamazov, The Bravados)
Best Supporting Actress: Kay Walsh (The Horse's Mouth)
Best Director: John Ford (The Last Hurrah)
Special Citation: Robert Donat (The Inn of the Sixth Happiness)

External links 
National Board of Review of Motion Pictures :: Awards for 1958

1958
National Board of Review Awards
National Board of Review Awards
National Board of Review Awards
National Board of Review Awards